is a Japanese music producer, arranger and bass guitarist.
He has worked extensively with Ringo Shiina, serving as her producer and touring bassist for many years, including his tenure with their band Tokyo Jihen from 2005 to 2012.

Biography 

He was born in New York City but moved to Japan when he was one.  He started piano classes with his elder sister when he was 3 years old. In 1970 he moved to Osaka. One year later he joined Chisato Elementary School. He began to study classical guitar in 1975 with his elder brother.

In 1976 Kameda moved to Tokyo. He developed a hobby of trying to intercept radio signals from across the ocean, using an instrument called BCL  (Broadcast Communications Limited), to hear western-style music. In 1977 he started broadcasting his own radio station (FM KAMEDA) from his room. Three years later he joined Musashi High School and bought his first bass guitar, a Yamaha BB2000. In 1984 Kameda exchanged his Yamaha for a Frettor and got his first Fender Jazz Bass. In 1987 he graduated from Waseda University and began to record self-made demo tapes with his arrangements. One year later he finally began his bassist and arranger-producer career.

In 1999, he participated in the production of Ringo Shiina's first and second album as an arranger, and they were big hits. Because of those hits, he received many commissions to produce music. That started his great success. Since then he has been producing for musicians and bands like Spitz, Ken Hirai, Shikao Suga, Do As Infinity, Angela Aki, and others. He also participates in many musicians' recordings as a session bassist, or plays a bass guitar as a member of various solo singers' tour bands, or temporary bands like Bank Band (2005–present).

From May 2 to 3, 2009, Kameda gathered artists whom he’s had relations with throughout his career, and promoted the music festival "Kame no Ongaeshi."

Related musicians 
The following are Japanese musicians and musical groups related to Kameda.
They were produced, or their songs were arranged by Kameda, and also he offered songs to them.

Musicians

Musical groups

External links 
 Makotoya – Seiji Kameda Official Web Site 
 Tokyo Jihen Official Web Site (by EMI) 
 The introduction of the member of Tokyo Jihen (by Ringo Shiina Official Web Site)

 
Living people
Japanese record producers
Japanese bass guitarists
1964 births
Tokyo Jihen members
Guitarists from New York City
20th-century American guitarists
Omega Tribe (Japanese band) members